Hexathelidae is a family of mygalomorph spiders. It is one of a number of families and genera of spiders known as funnel-web spiders. In 2018, the family was substantially reduced in size by genera being moved to three separate families: Atracidae, Macrothelidae and Porrhothelidae. Atracidae includes the most venomous species formerly placed in Hexathelidae.

Description 
The body is typically three times longer than it is wide. They are darkly colored, ranging from black to brown, with a glossy carapace covering the front part of the body. Like the related diplurid spiders, the hexathelids have generally long spinnerets.

Their moderately long posterior spinnerets and other features make the Hexathelidae appear similar to the Dipluridae, and were considered a subfamily of the latter until 1980.

Like other Mygalomorphae (also called the Orthognatha, an infraorder of spiders which includes the true tarantulas), these spiders have fangs which point straight down and do not cross each other (see also Araneomorphae). They have ample venom glands that lie entirely within their chelicerae. Their chelicerae and fangs are large and powerful.

Taxonomy
A molecular phylogenetic study in 2018 showed that Hexathelidae, as then circumscribed, was not monophyletic and hence split off genera into the new families Atracidae, Macrothelidae and Porrhothelidae. The following cladogram shows the relationships found between these families (former Hexathelidae families marked with boxes).

Genera

, the World Spider Catalog accepts the following genera:

Bymainiella Raven, 1978 — Australia
Hexathele Ausserer, 1871 — New Zealand
Mediothele Raven & Platnick, 1978 — Chile
Paraembolides Raven, 1980 — Australia
Plesiothele Raven, 1978 — Australia
Scotinoecus Simon, 1892 — Chile, Argentina
Teranodes Raven, 1985 — Australia

Formerly placed here
, some genera formerly placed in Hexathelidae have been moved to other families:
 Former subfamily Atracinae, now in Atracidae
 Atrax O. P-Cambridge, 1877 — Australia
 Hadronyche L. Koch, 1873 — Australia
 Illawarra Gray, 2010  — Australia
 Now in Macrothelidae
 Macrothele Ausserer, 1871 — Africa, Europe, Asia
 Now in Porrhothelidae
 Porrhothele Simon, 1892 — New Zealand

Distribution and habitat
Five of the seven genera are found in Australia and New Zealand. Two genera are from Argentina and Chile in South America.

Hexathelids typically live in burrows, which are constructed in the ground or in tree hollows. An elaborately constructed burrow entrance is common. These spiders construct a funnel-shaped web and lurk for prey in the small end of the funnel. They frequently search for a place to nest under human dwellings, or under nearby rocks, logs, or other similar objects. They are most active at night. Some build in rain forests, both in the soil and in hollows on trees; others build entirely in sand, e.g., Fraser Island, southeastern Queensland. In Australia, these spiders tend to prefer cooler climates, hence they are found primarily in rain forests.

See also
 List of Hexathelidae species

References

Further reading
 Raven, R.J. & Platnick, N.I. (1978): A new genus of the spider family Dipluridae from Chile (Araneae, Mygalomorphae). J. Arachnol. 6: 73-77. PDF (Mediothele, now in Hexathelidae)

External links

 : Queensland Museum: Funnelweb spiders
 Find-a-spider guide

 
Mygalomorphae families